The 2020 Russian Women's Curling Cup was held from September 30 to October 6, 2020 at the Palace of Figure Skating and Curling in Dmitrov, Moscow Oblast.

All games played were 8 ends.

All times are listed in Moscow Time (UTC+03:00)

Teams

Round-robin standings
Final round-robin standings

Round-robin results

Group A

Group B

Points: 2 for win, 1 for loss, 0 for technical loss (did not start)

Playoffs

Semifinals
Monday, October 5, 7:40 pm

Third place game
Tuesday, October 6, 10:00 am

Final
Tuesday, October 6, 10:00 am

Final standings

References

External links

2020 Russian Women's Curling Cup - Curlingzone

See also
2020 Russian Men's Curling Cup

Russian Women's Curling Cup
Russian Women's Curling Cup
Women's Curling Cup
Russian Women's Curling Cup
Sport in Moscow Oblast